WNOR (98.7 MHz "FM99") is a commercial FM radio station licensed to Norfolk, Virginia, serving the Hampton Roads (Norfolk-Virginia Beach-Newport News) radio market. WNOR is owned and operated by Saga Communications.  It airs an active rock radio format.

WNOR broadcasts in the HD Radio (hybrid) format.  Studios and offices are on Greenbrier Circle in Chesapeake.   The transmitter is next to Riverside Memorial Park in Norfolk. The Class B signal covers Southeastern Virginia and Northeastern North Carolina.

History
On July 16, 1962, WNOR-FM first signed on the air, owned by the Norfolk Broadcasting Company.  It was the sister station to AM 1230 WNOR (still co-owned but now defunct, was last called WJYI).  WNOR-FM  was an easy listening station, and at one point employed an all-female air staff, a revolutionary move at the time.

In 1969, WNOR-FM began airing a progressive rock format from 9pm-6am.  Eventually the rock music proved more popular than the easy listening sounds.  WNOR-FM abandoned the "split-format" approach in 1974 and began playing rock full-time. The station’s Arbitron ratings quickly took off, culminating in the station’s rise to #1 – the first time an FM station in the Norfolk market had achieved #1 status.

By the 1980s, the station had moved to an album rock format, based more on album sales than the previous progressive rock sound.  In 1986, WNOR-AM-FM were acquired by Saga Communications, the current owner.  Saga decided to simulcast the FM station's rock format on the AM station.

In 1994, Saga Communications acquired another FM station in the market, WAFX in Suffolk.  With WAFX broadcasting a classic rock format, WNOR-FM began to specialize in a current-based, harder-edged sound, bringing it into the active rock format In 2001, the AM station went to an adult standards format as WJYI, no longer simulcast with WNOR-FM.  A short time later, the "-FM" suffix was dropped from WNOR's official call sign.

WNOR had major success with newer bands on air during the late 1990's and throughout the 2000's with a lot of local on air promotions and concert support and on demand requests to help further expose newer bands. 
The station does play "new rock" on air, every week they air their infamous "Hummer Of The Week" to debut a new band or a familiar band's new single throughout the whole week. Their music programming is still running as a Mainstream rock style to their Active rock format. consisting of the 1990's, the 2000's and newer all mixed in, 2000's nu Metal is not heard much on air, but every once in a while it can be played. All of the classic and older songs from the 1970's and 1980's have since been moved over to their sister station, 106-9 The Fox, as they have also updated their music format to including 1990's alternative and grunge into their playlist, expanding to 4 decades total of classic rock history.

References

External links
FM99 WNOR Online

Active rock radio stations in the United States
NOR
Radio stations established in 1961
1961 establishments in Virginia